If Beale Street Could Talk is a 2018 American romantic drama film written and directed by Barry Jenkins and based on James Baldwin's 1974 novel of the same name. It stars an ensemble cast that includes KiKi Layne, Stephan James, Colman Domingo, Teyonah Parris, Michael Beach, Dave Franco, Diego Luna, Pedro Pascal, Ed Skrein, Brian Tyree Henry, and Regina King. The film follows a young woman who, with her family's support, seeks to clear the name of her wrongly charged lover and prove his innocence before the birth of their child.

Following the success of Jenkins' Moonlight (2016), it was announced in July 2017 that he would direct an adaptation of Baldwin's novel of the same name, from a screenplay that he wrote in 2013. Principal photography began in October 2017 in New York City and the cast was announced that month.

If Beale Street Could Talk had its world premiere at the Toronto International Film Festival on September 9, 2018 and was theatrically released in the United States on December 14, 2018, by Annapurna Pictures. It was praised for its acting, Jenkins's screenplay and direction, cinematography, and the musical score. It was chosen by both the National Board of Review and the American Film Institute as one of the Top 10 Films of 2018. The film received numerous accolades and nominations, including Best Supporting Actress wins for King at the Academy Awards and Golden Globes. It was also nominated for Best Motion Picture – Drama and Best Screenplay at the 76th Golden Globe Awards, and Best Adapted Screenplay and Best Original Score at the 91st Academy Awards.

Plot
Note: The film's structure is non-linear, but this plot summary is written in a linear fashion.

Clementine "Tish" Rivers and Alonzo "Fonny" Hunt have been friends their whole lives. They become romantically involved when they get older. In the 1970s, they struggle to find an apartment, as most New York landlords would not rent to black people. Eventually, they find a place in a warehouse being converted to loft apartments; Levy, the Jewish landlord, rents it to them at a good rate because he enjoys seeing couples who are in love, regardless of race.

That night, Tish is harassed by a man while in a mostly white grocery store. He begins to assault her, so Fonny physically throws him out of the store. A white policeman nearby, Officer Bell, attempts to arrest Fonny for it, but reluctantly lets him go when the Jewish woman who runs the grocery store vouches for them and chastises Bell for his racism.

Fonny is later arrested and accused of raping a woman named Victoria Rogers. Although nearly impossible for him to have gone from the scene of the crime to the apartment where he was arrested in the time between the rape and the arrest, the case against Fonny is considered strong due to Officer Bell's testimony. The claim is he saw Fonny fleeing the scene, and Victoria identified Fonny in a lineup as her rapist. Tish, as well as Fonny's friend Daniel Carty, were with him at the time of the rape, but it is considered an unreliable alibi due to Tish's romantic relationship with Fonny and Daniel's previous conviction for grand theft auto (he had been arrested for marijuana possession but was offered a plea for auto theft, a lesser charge at the time).

Tish visits Fonny in jail as he awaits trial and reveals to him that she is pregnant with their baby. Fonny is excited to be a father, but saddened that the birth might be while he is still behind bars. Later, Tish tells her parents, Sharon and Joseph, and sister, Ernestine, about her pregnancy. Though worried for her, Tish's family is supportive and decide to invite Fonny's family over to share the news.

Frank, Fonny's father, is excited, however, Fonny's highly religious mother declares that as the child was conceived out of wedlock, Tish and her child are damned. As Mrs. Hunt begins to leave with her daughters in disgust after Frank hits her, Sharon reminds her that she has just condemned her own grandchild, leaving her emotionally distraught as she is escorted away.

In a bar, Frank and Joseph discuss how the former is worried about paying for a child and Fonny's legal expenses, but Joseph convinces him that they will be able to provide for their grandchild the same way they provided for their own children.

Sharon travels to Victoria's native Puerto Rico to plead with her to change her testimony. She tries to convince her she mistakenly identified Fonny as her rapist, but Victoria refuses. Questioning whether Victoria could have seen her rapist's face in the dark, Victoria says the police told her to identify Fonny in a line-up, and she did so. When Sharon gently touches her, Victoria begins to scream. An elderly woman overhears the commotion and comes to take Victoria away. Discouraged by the seeming hopelessness of his case and the constant trial delays, Tish gives birth to her son without Fonny, who eventually accepts a plea deal.

Tish and their child, Alonzo Jr., visit Fonny in prison. They share dinner together from the vending machines, while looking forward to Fonny's eventual release.

Cast

Production 

On July 10, 2017, it was announced that Barry Jenkins would direct an adaptation of the James Baldwin novel If Beale Street Could Talk. Jenkins wrote the screenplay during the summer of 2013, as he was writing Moonlight.

On August 29, 2017, Stephan James was set to star. In September 2017, KiKi Layne and Teyonah Parris were also added, with Layne in the female lead.

On October 18, 2017, it was reported that If Beale Street Could Talk had begun filming in New York City. That same month, Regina King, Colman Domingo, Brian Tyree Henry, Dave Franco, and Ed Skrein joined the cast of the film. Michael Beach, Finn Wittrock, Aunjanue Ellis, and Diego Luna were added in November, and in December 2017, Pedro Pascal and Emily Rios joined. In March 2018, Nicholas Britell was announced as the composer of the film's score.

Music

Release
If Beale Street Could Talk began a limited release in the United States on December 14, 2018, with an expanded release on December 25. It had previously been scheduled for November 30, 2018. The film had its world premiere at the Toronto International Film Festival on September 9, 2018. It also screened at the New York Film Festival on October 11, 2018, the New Orleans Film Festival on October 21, 2018, and the St. Louis International Film Festival on November 10, 2018.

Reception

Box office
If Beale Street Could Talk grossed $14.9 million in the United States and Canada, and $5.6 million in other territories, for a worldwide total of $20.6 million.

During its opening weekend, December 14, the film made $219,174 from four theaters, for a per-venue average of $54,794, one of the best of 2018. In its second weekend, the film earned $114,902, and in its third made $759,578 from 65 theaters. In its fourth weekend, the film expanded to 335 theaters, earning $1.9 million. The next weekend, January 11, following its Golden Globe win the film expanded to 1,018 theaters and grossed $2.3 million.

Critical response

The website's critical consensus reads: "If Beale Street Could Talk honors its source material with a beautifully filmed adaptation that finds director Barry Jenkins further strengthening his visual and narrative craft." On Metacritic, the film has a weighted average score of 87 out of 100, based on 53 critics, indicating "universal acclaim". Audiences polled by PostTrak gave the film an 82% overall positive score and a 65% "definite recommend".

Eric Kohn of IndieWire gave the film an "A−", stating: "Jenkins' follow-up to Moonlight also maintains his own expressionistic aesthetic, with its lush colors and entrancing faces that speak volumes in few words, resulting in a fascinating hybrid experience — a seminal voice of the past merging with one of the present in a mesmerizing burst of creative passion." Siddhant Adlakha of /Film said the film felt "electric and alive" and specified, "The worlds these characters create — whether in the form of individual, soul-piercing stares, or moments of burning passion filmed in profile — carry with them the weight of the very history of which Tish constantly speaks."

Accolades

At the 76th Golden Globe Awards, the film was nominated for three awards: Best Motion Picture – Drama, Best Supporting Actress for King, and Best Screenplay, with King winning. At the 91st Academy Awards, the film was nominated for Best Adapted Screenplay, Best Original Score, and Best Supporting Actress for Regina King, with King winning. At the 24th Critics' Choice Awards, the film received five nominations, including Best Picture, Best Supporting Actress for King, and Best Adapted Screenplay. Both the National Board of Review and American Film Institute included it in their top 10 films of 2018.

See also
 List of black films of the 2010s

References

External links 

 
 
 
 

2018 films
2018 romantic drama films
African-American drama films
African-American romance films
American historical romance films
American nonlinear narrative films
American romantic drama films
Annapurna Pictures films
Films about capital punishment
Films about racism
Films based on American novels
Films based on works by James Baldwin
Films directed by Barry Jenkins
Films featuring a Best Supporting Actress Academy Award-winning performance
Films featuring a Best Supporting Actress Golden Globe-winning performance
Films set in the 1970s
Films set in New York City
Films set in New York (state)
Films set in Puerto Rico
Plan B Entertainment films
Films scored by Nicholas Britell
Independent Spirit Award for Best Film winners
Fiction with false allegations of sex crimes
2010s English-language films
2010s American films
2018 independent films
American independent films